Eduards Berklavs (June 15, 1914 – November 25, 2004) was a Soviet and Latvian politician.

Eduards Berklavs was born in Kurmāle Parish, today part of the Kuldīga Municipality. During his youth, he was active in labour and communist organizations. In 1930s, he was arrested and served a prison sentence for his communist activities. After Latvia was occupied by the Soviet Union in 1940, Berklavs, with a background as a Komsomol and Communist Party official, rose to become the deputy chairman of the Council of Ministers of Latvian SSR in 1950s. In this position, he opposed the Soviet policies of Russification, supported a larger role for Latvian language and proposed to limit immigration from other parts of the Soviet Union to Latvia. This led to him being labelled as Latvian nationalist and deposed from his position in 1959. He later wrote the Letter of 17 Latvian communists, where he accused the Soviet government of "Great Russian chauvinism" and the "forced assimilation".

In the late 1980s, Berklavs became a Latvian independence activist. He was one of the founders and the first chairman of Latvian National Independence Movement (LNNK), a pro-independence political organization. He was simultaneously active in Latvian Popular Front and the Congress of Citizens of Latvia. During this period, Berklavs was one of the most prominent independence activists. He was elected to the Latvian parliament in 1990 and 1993; on both occasions he was the oldest member of the parliament.

References 

1914 births
2004 deaths
People from Kuldīga Municipality
People from Courland Governorate
Communist Party of Latvia politicians
Latvian National Independence Movement politicians
For Fatherland and Freedom/LNNK politicians
Fifth convocation members of the Supreme Soviet of the Soviet Union
Members of the Supreme Soviet of the Latvian Soviet Socialist Republic, 1947–1951
Deputies of the Supreme Council of the Republic of Latvia
Deputies of the 5th Saeima
Soviet Army officers
Soviet military personnel of World War II
Recipients of the Order of the Red Banner
Recipients of the Order of the Red Banner of Labour
Recipients of the Order of the Red Star
Recipients of the Order of the Three Stars